= Justin Kofi Dorgu =

Ghanaian High Court Judge

Justin Kofi Dorgu is a Ghanaian High Court Judge. In 2018, he presided over the Accra High Court. In 2025, John Dramani Mahama swore in Dorgu and 20 others as Justices of the Court of Appeal. During a 2026 ruling in Quaye v. Quaye (Joana Quaye v Richard Nii Armah Quaye), he made a comment which raised a debate about the "relevance and impact of judicial decisions" in Ghana.
